OB Flat is a south-eastern suburb of Mount Gambier in South Australia.

The name for this suburb is believed to derive from a herd of cattle bearing the brand "OB" (owned by O. Beswick) which once roamed in the area.

The 2016 Australian census which was conducted in August 2016 reports that OB Flat had a population of 398 people.

OB Flat is located within the federal division of Barker, the state electoral district of Mount Gambier and the local government areas of the District Council of Grant and the City of Mount Gambier. It is also part of Mount Gambier’s urban sprawl.

References

Towns in South Australia
Limestone Coast